Worthen House may refer to:
Daniel Worthen House, historic house in Somerville, Massachusetts
Worthen House (Lowell, Massachusetts), historic tavern